Product classification or product taxonomy is a type of economic taxonomy which organizes products for a variety of purposes. However, not only products can be referred to in a standardized way but also sales practices in form of the “Incoterms” and industries can be classified into categories.

Some standard product classifications include:

 CPA — Classification of Products by Activity, a product nomenclature that was used in the European Economic Community and now in use in the EU, a European version of the CPC
 CPA 1996
 CPA 2002
 CPA 2008
 CPA 2.1
 CPC — Central Product Classification, a United Nations standard classification for products
 ETIM, the ETIM Technical Information Model
 Global Classification and Harmonized Schedule Numbers for customs classification
 HS — Harmonized Commodity Description and Coding System
 SITC — Standard International Trade Classification
 Trade in Services
 UNSPSC, the United Nations Standard Products and Services Code
 IEC Common Data Dictionary (IEC CDD), a product classification and product description based on international standards and defined by the International Electrotechnical Commission
 eCl@ss, a global and ISO/IEC-conform system for classification and description of products and services, maintained by the non-governmental eCl@ss e.V. association

See also

 Industry classification

Notes

References

 CPA 2.1 at the Eurostat website
 United Nations Statistical Commission, "International Family of Economic and Social Classifications", p. 5 PDF